The men's 500 metres in short track speed skating at the 2014 Winter Olympics was held between 18–21 February 2014 at the Iceberg Skating Palace in Sochi, Russia.

The qualifying heats was held on 18 February with the quarterfinal, the semifinal and the final on 21 February.

The defending Olympic Champion was Charles Hamelin of Canada, while the defending World Champion was Liang Wenhao of China. None of them won a medal.

Viktor Ahn of Russia won the race, getting the third individual medal in short track speed skating at the same Olympics (two golds and one bronze) and thus replicating his own performance at the 2006 Winter Olympics. No other male short track skater ever won three individual medals at the same Olympics. Wu Dajing of China finished second, and Charle Cournoyer of Canada won the bronze medal.

Qualification
Countries were assigned quotas using a combination of the four special Olympic Qualification classifications that were held at two world cups in November 2013. A nation may enter a maximum of three athletes per event. For this event a total of 32 athletes representing 16 nations qualified to compete.

Results
The event was started at 20:30.

Preliminaries

Heats
 Q – qualified for Quarterfinals
 ADV – advanced
 PEN – penalty

Quarterfinal
 Q – qualified for Semifinals
 ADV – advanced
 PEN – penalty

Semifinals
 QA – qualified for Final A
 QB – qualified for Final B
 ADV – advanced
 PEN – penalty
 YC – yellow card

Finals

Final B (Classification Round)

Final A (Medal Round)

References

Men's short track speed skating at the 2014 Winter Olympics